Tagandougou is a rural commune in the Cercle of Yanfolila in the Sikasso Region of southern Mali. The commune covers an area of 614 square kilometers and includes 7 villages. In the 2009 census it had a population of 5,775. The village of Binko, the administrative center (chef-lieu) of the commune, is 52 km north of Yanfolila on the western side of the Sélingué Dam.

References

External links
.

Communes of Sikasso Region